Vyacheslav Vladimirovich Kuznetsov (born 15 June 1955 in Vienna) is a Belarusian classical music composer.

Selected works
 Diary of a Madman (Записки сумасшедшего), Opera in 1 act after Nikolai Gogol 
 Capriccio (Капрыччио) for viola solo (1988)
 Heterophony (Гетэрафонія) for oboe, violin and viola (1993)

References

External links
 Vyacheslav Kuznetsov at the Living Composers Project
 Композитор Вячеслав Кузнецов: «Партитуры не горят» (in Russian)
 Оперный театр Беларуси - Записки сумасшедшего - YouTube
 Вячеслав Владимирович Кузнецов (in Russian)
 Композитор Вячеслав Кузнецов о том, как поставить балет и спеть Достоевского (in Russian)
Кузнецов Вячеслав Владимирович (in Russian)
ВЫСТАВКА "ПРОФЕССИЯ – КОМПОЗИТОР" К ЮБИЛЕЮ В.В. КУЗНЕЦОВА (in Russian)
Вячеслав КУЗНЕЦОВ: Musica Marginale (in Russian)

Living people
1955 births
20th-century classical composers
Belarusian composers
Musicians from Vienna
Male classical composers
20th-century male musicians